This list is of the Cultural Properties of Japan designated in the category of  for the Prefecture of Kagawa.

National Cultural Properties
As of 1 July 2019, twenty-two Important Cultural Properties have been designated, being of national significance.

Prefectural Cultural Properties
As of 1 May 2019, twenty properties have been designated at a prefectural level.

See also
 Cultural Properties of Japan
 List of National Treasures of Japan (paintings)
 Japanese painting
 List of Cultural Properties of Japan - historical materials (Kagawa)
 List of Historic Sites of Japan (Kagawa)
 List of Museums in Kagawa Prefecture

References

External links
  Cultural Properties in Kagawa Prefecture

Cultural Properties,Kagawa
Cultural Properties,Paintings
Paintings,Kagawa
Lists of paintings